Martin Hall is a dormitory on the campus of Hendrix College in Conway, Arkansas.  It was built in 1918 to a design by noted Arkansas architect Charles L. Thompson.  It is a three-story masonry structure, faced on dark red brick with stone trim elements.  It has a wide central section topped by a gable roof, with projecting gabled sections at its ends.  Its ground floor windows are set in arched openings giving it an arcaded appearance.  The hall was listed on the National Register of Historic Places in 1982 for its architectural significance.

Martin Hall closed for renovations in August 2021, as part of Hendrix College's Residence Hall Renewal Project. Updates to the hall will include, "new HVAC systems to address air quality, humidity, and moisture concerns; new plumbing to streamline maintenance; new layouts for bathrooms to increase privacy; reconfigured laundry areas and study/lounge spaces to promote interaction among residents; ADA-compliant entries and living arrangements; LED lighting upgrades; stronger wireless connectivity; and new doors and flooring throughout both buildings." 

The dorm reopened in August of 2022 for students to live it. It has space for 123 men with a mix of single, double and triple occupancy rooms.

See also
National Register of Historic Places listings in Faulkner County, Arkansas

References

University and college buildings on the National Register of Historic Places in Arkansas
Gothic Revival architecture in Arkansas
Residential buildings completed in 1918
Buildings and structures in Conway, Arkansas
Hendrix College
1918 establishments in Arkansas